The London Conference of 1832 was an international conference convened to establish a stable government in Greece. Negotiations between the three Great Powers (Britain, France and Russia) resulted in the establishment of the Kingdom of Greece under a Bavarian Prince. The decisions were ratified in the Treaty of Constantinople later that year. The treaty followed the Akkerman Convention which had previously recognized another territorial change in the Balkans, the suzerainty of the Principality of Serbia.

Background

Greece had won its independence from the Ottoman Empire in the Greek War of Independence (1821–1829) with the help of Britain, France and Russia. In the London Protocol of 3 February 1830, the three powers had assigned the borders of the new state. However, when the governor of Greece, John Capodistria (Ioannis Kapodistrias) was assassinated in 1831 in Nafplion, the Greek peninsula plunged into confusion. The Great Powers sought a formal end of the war and a recognized government in Greece.

Conference of London
In May 1832, British Foreign Secretary Palmerston convened with French and Russian diplomats, and, without consultation of the Greeks, decided that Greece should be a monarchy. The convention offered the throne to the Bavarian Prince, Otto. They also established the line of succession which would pass the crown to Otto's descendants, or his younger brothers should he have no issue. It was also decided that in no case would the crowns of Greece and Bavaria be joined. As co-guarantors of the monarchy, the Great Powers also empowered their ambassadors in Constantinople, the Ottoman capital, to secure the end of the Greek War of Independence.

On 21 July 1832 British ambassador Sir Stratford Canning and the other representatives concluded the Treaty of Constantinople, which set the boundaries of the new Kingdom of Greece along the Arta–Volos line.

References

  Protocol of London, 1832

1832 in London
History of modern Greece
Diplomatic conferences in the United Kingdom
19th-century diplomatic conferences
1832 in international relations
Greece–United Kingdom relations
Conferences in London
1832 conferences
Succession acts